New Bern is a light rail station in Charlotte, North Carolina. The at-grade dual side platforms are a stop along the Lynx Blue Line and serves the neighborhoods of Sedgefield, Southside Park and the southernmost point of South End.

Location 
The station is located next to New Bern Street and is accessible by sidewalk and the Charlotte Rail Trail. The immediate area features multi-level apartments, retail, and breweries. Nearby is the South Boulevard Light Rail Facility.

Artwork 
The Pepsi Cube, created by Ivan Depena, is a blue cube made of crushed Pepsi cans. The sculpture is a reminder of the former Pepsi bottling complex that existed at the same location from 1966-2015.

History
The station officially opened for service on Saturday, November 24, 2007, and as part of its opening celebration fares were not collected; regular service with fare collection commenced on Monday, November 26, 2007.

Incidents and accidents
Service was fully restored by the following day, but this marked the first disruption in service since the opening of the line in November 2007 due to conditions outside the control of CATS.

Station layout 
The station consists of two side platforms and six covered waiting areas; other amenities include ticket vending machines, emergency call box, and bicycle racks. The station also features several art installations including a drinking fountain basin designed to look like dogwood, the North Carolina state flower, by Nancy Blum. Bas-reliefs entitled Hornbeam, by Alice Adams. Leaf motifs on both the pavers and shelters, by Leticia Huerta. River stone benches, by Hoss Haley, and track fencing with willow oak leaves, by Shaun Cassidy.

References

External links
 
 New Bern Station
 South End Charlotte

New Bern
Railway stations in the United States opened in 2007
2007 establishments in North Carolina